Club Deportivo Coreano was an amateur Argentinian football club based in Lobos, Buenos Aires which played at the Liga Lobense de Fútbol up until 2018.

The club was founded with the aim of promoting cultural exchange between the Argentine and Korean republics, using football as a universal language.

References

External links
Coreano blog 
Club Deportivo de Lobos Blogspot (in Spanish)

C
C
C